The Orwell Bridge is a concrete box girder bridge just south of Ipswich in Suffolk, England.  Opened to road traffic in 1982, the bridge carries the A14 road (formerly the A45) over the River Orwell.

History

Design
The main span is 190 metres which, at the time of its construction, was the longest pre-stressed concrete span in use in the UK. The two spans adjacent to the main span are 106m, known as anchor spans. Most of the other spans are 59m. The total length is 1,287 metres from Wherstead to the site of the former Ipswich Airport. The width is 24 metres with an air draft of 43 metres; the bridge had to be at least 41 metres high. The approach roads were designed by CH Dobbie & Partners of Cardiff, later bought by Babtie, Shaw and Morton then Jacobs in 2004.

The bridge is constructed of a pair of continuous concrete box girders with expansion joints that allow for expansion and contraction. The girders are hollow, allowing for easier inspection, as well as providing access for services, including telecom, power, and a 711mm water main from the nearby Alton Water reservoir. The necessary inspections still cause major disruption to traffic every six years; during the inspection in the summer of 2005, the delays caused by lane closures and speed restrictions added between 30 and 60 minutes to journey times during the peak commuting periods.

The bridge design took into consideration the impact on the Orwell Estuary, as well as the needs of the port of Ipswich. The location close to the southern edge of Ipswich was deemed convenient for the industrial areas of the West Bank Terminal and Ransomes Industrial Estate on the eastern end. The bridge was set at an angle to the river to get the best relationship to the surrounding terrain.

The air draft of the central span was chosen to be as low as possible without adversely affecting port operations. Although some have said that the resulting hump affects visibility and road safety, there have not been enough incidents causing injury for the Highways Agency to identify it for greater detailed investigation and possible amendments. The consulting engineers were Sir William Halcrow and Partners. Frederick Gibberd Partners worked on the project to ensure the bridge was as sympathetic as possible to its surroundings, with the final design winning the approval of the Royal Fine Art Commission.

The Department for Transport funded the project and, partly because of the bridge, paid for radars and cameras to be installed at the port's Orwell Navigation Service to monitor the river and the bridge.

Construction
Pilings were sunk 40 metres into the river bottom; Pigott Foundations of Ormskirk drilled 1142 piles; the main contractor of the substructure was Stevin Construction B.V., a Dutch company. The main span was constructed using a balanced cantilever technique, casting sections on alternating sides of the pier in a weekly cycle. Høsveis & Bofa of Hønefoss in Norway helped form the box girder (steelwork). The roller bearings were from Maurer AG of Germany. Mageba UK (Swiss) of Bicester supplied the bridge bearings and expansion joints. The pre-stressed concrete box girder sections had VSL tendons and GKN super-strand wire rope. The construction gantries were fabricated by Fairfield Mabey.

It was part of the first section of the Ipswich Bypass; the contracts for the approach roads were given to Costain (£10.7m, eastern) and Cementation (£9.3m, western). For this section of the bypass, Robert McGregor & Sons, subcontracting to Cementation laid 6,900m of concrete in 48 days with a slipform paver; Costain laid 10,400m of concrete in 31 days with a concrete train.

Construction of the bridge began in October 1979 and was completed 1 April 1982. It was opened on 17 December 1982 by David Howell, Baron Howell of Guildford, then the Secretary of State for Transport.

Maintenance
Bridge bearing replacement works were carried out by Jackson Civil Engineering Ltd during a 52-hour closure of the north deck, carrying the eastbound A14, over the weekend of 11–14 February 2011. The new bridge bearings were designed and manufactured by the engineering company, Freyssinet Ltd.

In February 2014 a meeting of various agencies was held to review to review diversions when A14 and Orwell Bridge are forced to close.

Speed limit
A permanent reduced speed limit of 60 mph was introduced in November 2015 for safety reasons.

Structure
The Stour and Orwell Walk passes over the bridge.

Usage
 the bridge was used by 60,000 vehicles per day, about 83% of its capacity. In 2006 it was predicted that the bridge is expected to be running over capacity by 2015.

Incidents

Total closures
When the bridge is closed in both directions for more than a short period of time, normally as a safety precaution due to high winds, most of Ipswich's roads are brought to a near-standstill by diverted traffic.

Popular culture
The bridge appears in the 1987 Cold War drama The Fourth Protocol, in which two RAF helicopters are shown flying under it, and at the end of the 2013 film The Numbers Station.

References

External links 

 IHT
Official website
Orwell Bridge High Wind Protocol - Briefing paper
Ipswich, the A14 and the Orwell Bridge 26 January 2017 Highways Agency
A14 Orwell Bridge Study - Technical note March 2013

Babergh District
Box girder bridges in the United Kingdom
Bridges across the River Orwell
Bridges completed in 1982
Bridges in Suffolk
Buildings and structures in Ipswich
Concrete bridges in the United Kingdom
Constituent roads of European route E30
Roads in England
1982 establishments in England